Zierbena is a town and municipality located in the province of Biscay in the autonomous community of Basque Country, northern  Spain.

Ferry port

The ferry port in Zierbena (which is known to some as Bilbao Ferry Port) has two departures and arrivals per week of the MV Cap Finistère (for Brittany Ferries) to and from Portsmouth (Portsmouth International Port).

References

External links

 ZIERBENA in the Bernardo Estornés Lasa - Auñamendi Encyclopedia (Euskomedia Fundazioa) 

Municipalities in Biscay
Estuary of Bilbao
Fishing communities